Hussein Ali Mahfouz (3 May 1926 – 19 January 2009) was an Iraqi scholar in the field of Semitic languages.

Early life 

Mahfouz was born in Al Kadhimiya, Baghdad into a Muslim Shia religious family. His father died when he was a child. He was raised by his mother and his uncle. In elementary school he began writing and translating texts from English to Arabic.

Academic career 
After graduating from high school Mahfouz was accepted at Dar Al-Maualemen (the House of Teachers) college in Baghdad; he graduated in 1948. Then he received his Ph.D. in Comparative literature from the University of Tehran in 1952. After returning to Iraq in 1956 he was appointed as a professor in Dar Al-Maualemen Al-'Aali (the House of Teachers for higher studies) and an inspector of Arabic language in the ministry of knowledge.

In 1961 Mahfouz moved to the USSR to teach Arabic language and literature at Leningrad State University. In 1969 he established the department of Oriental studies at the College of Literature of the University of Baghdad.

Later career 
Mahfouz retired from teaching in the late 1990s. He kept a position as a judge of Masters and Ph.D. candidates, until the American invasion of Iraq in 2003. He died in Kadhimiya hospital at the age of 83 with a bibliography of almost 1500 books and articles.
Male mark Salem al-Alusi , said President Ahmed Hassan al-Bakr in the beginning of his reign, Iran demanded recovery of the remains of Harun al-Rashid al-Khalifa, being a symbol of Baghdad in its golden age, and the invitation urged from the late  Abdul Jabbar Jomard former minister during the reign of  Abd al-Karim Qasim, but Iran refused, and contrast asked retrieve the remains of Sheikh Abdul Qadir Gilani , being born Kellan Iran, and then request the president of Mustafa Jawad mark, a statement about it, Mustafa Jawad answered: The sources, who remember that Sheikh Abdul Qadir was born in Gilan Iran, sources depends novel one and passed without a study and investigation, Either make more sense is born in a village called (generation) near the cities, but untrue being from Iran or that his grandfather named Gilan, which was confirmed by the mark Hussein Ali Mahfouz in Jalawla Festival held by the Union of Arab Historians and was present Alusi also in 1996, and actually the Iranian state told so But the intervention of an Arab country, closed the subject<ref> Tucker, Spencer (2010). The Encyclopedia of Middle East Wars: The United States in the Persian Gulf, Afghanistan, and Iraq Conflicts. 1. ABC-CLIO. pp. 191–192. ISBN 978-1-85109-947-4.

Further reading 
http://www.elaph.com/Web/Culture/2009/1/401975.htm
http://www.alnoor.se/article.asp?id=76182
http://www.annabaa.org/nbanews/2009/11/277.htm
http://www.ahewar.org/debat/show.art.asp?aid=135631
http://www.freeiraqivoice.com/2011/11/24/%D8%A7%D9%84%D8%B9%D9%84%D8%A7%D9%85%D8%A9-%D8%AD%D8%B3%D9%8A%D9%86-%D8%B9%D9%84%D9%8A-%D9%85%D8%AD%D9%81%D9%88%D8%B8-..-%D9%85%D9%88%D8%B3%D9%88%D8%B9%D9%8A%D9%91%D8%A9.html
http://www.ahewar.org/debat/show.art.asp?aid=203989
http://www.ahewar.org/debat/show.art.asp?aid=78595
http://www.shaaubmagazine.com/view.423/
https://web.archive.org/web/20130321021805/http://iraqifigures.org/arabic/figures/item/405-%D8%AD%D8%B3%D9%8A%D9%86-%D8%B9%D9%84%D9%8A-%D9%85%D8%AD%D9%81%D9%88%D8%B8.html

References 

1926 births
Iraqi Shia Muslims
Academic staff of the University of Baghdad
Iraqi translators
2009 deaths
University of Tehran alumni
Semiticists
Iraqi academics
20th-century translators
Academic staff of Saint Petersburg State University
Researchers of Persian literature